Dr. Marvalene Hughes served as the president of Dillard University from 2005 to 2011.  From 1994 to 2005, she was the president of California State University, Stanislaus.

Ms. Hughes received a PhD in Counseling and Administration from Florida State University.  Her MS, in Counseling, and her BS in English and History, are both from Tuskegee University. She also received an Honorary Doctorate from Brown University.

According to an article in Ebony, Ms. Hughes has a husband and three grown up children.

Notes

Year of birth missing (living people)
Living people
Dillard University faculty
Tuskegee University alumni
African-American academics
Florida State University alumni
California State University, Stanislaus faculty
Place of birth missing (living people)
21st-century African-American people